Indiana is a town and the capital of the Indiana District in the Maynas Province of Peru. Located in Peru's northernmost Loreto Region, it is deep in the Amazon rainforest and sits on the Amazon River. 

Populated places in the Loreto Region